Claypool is an unincorporated community in Summers County, West Virginia, United States, located south of Meadow Bridge. It was also known as Humoco or Tina, a defunct coal town.

References

Unincorporated communities in Summers County, West Virginia
Unincorporated communities in West Virginia
Coal towns in West Virginia